Willow Oaks is an unincorporated community within the city of Richmond, Virginia.

References

Unincorporated communities in Virginia
Richmond, Virginia